The historical television series René Lévesque, broadcast in 1994, tells the story of René Lévesque, a Quebec premier. It stars Denis Bouchard as Lévesque. Another notable member of the cast is Claudia Cardinale, of 8½, Once Upon a Time in the West, and Pink Panther fame.

See also
List of Quebec television series
Television of Quebec
Culture of Quebec
Politics of Quebec
History of Quebec

Television shows set in Quebec
1990s Canadian drama television series
1994 Canadian television series debuts
René Lévesque
Canadian political drama television series